Edward John Smith  (27 January 1850 – 15 April 1912) was a British naval officer. He served as master of numerous White Star Line vessels.

Early life
Edward John Smith was born on 27 January 1850 on Well Street, Hanley, Staffordshire, England to Edward Smith, a potter, and Catherine Hancock, born Marsh, who married on 2 August 1841 in Shelton, Staffordshire. His parents later owned a shop.

Smith attended the Etruria British School until the age of 13 when he left and operated a steam hammer at the Etruria Forge. In 1867, aged 17 he went to Liverpool in the footsteps of his half-brother Joseph Hancock, a captain on a sailing ship. He began his apprenticeship on Senator Weber, owned by A Gibson & Co. of Liverpool.

On 13 January 1887, Smith married Sarah Eleanor Pennington at St Oswald's Church, Winwick, Lancashire. Their daughter, Helen Melville Smith, was born in Waterloo, Liverpool on 2 April 1898. When the White Star line transferred its transatlantic port from Liverpool to Southampton in 1907, the family moved to a red brick, twin-gabled house, named "Woodhead", on Winn Road, Highfield, Southampton, Hampshire.

Career

Early commands
He served aboard the company's liners to Australia and to New York City, where he quickly rose in status. Smith failed his first navigation exam, but on the next attempt in the following week he passed, and in February, 1888, Smith earned his Extra Master's Certificate. Smith joined the Royal Naval Reserve, receiving a commission as a Lieutenant, which entitled him to add the letters "RNR" after his name. This meant that in a time of war he could be called upon to serve in the Royal Navy. His ships had the distinction of being able to fly the Blue Ensign of the RNR; British merchant vessels generally flew the Red Ensign.Smith retired from the RNR in 1905 with the rank of Commander.

Later commands

Smith was 's captain for nine years commencing in 1895. When the Boer War started in 1899, Majestic was called upon to transport troops to Cape Colony. Smith made two trips to South Africa, both without incident, and in 1903, for his service, King Edward VII awarded him the Transport Medal, showing the "South Africa" clasp. Smith was regarded as a "safe captain". As he rose in seniority, he gained a following amongst passengers with some sailing the Atlantic only on a ship he captained.

Smith even became known as the "Millionaires' Captain". From 1904 on, Smith commanded the White Star Line's newest ships on their maiden voyages. Her maiden voyage from Liverpool to New York, sailing 29 June 1904, went without incident. Once again, the maiden voyage went without incident. During his command of Adriatic, Smith received the long service Decoration for Officers of the Royal Naval Reserve (RD).

As one of the world's most experienced sea captains, Smith was called upon to take first command of the lead ship in a new class of ocean liners, the  – again, the largest vessel in the world at that time. The maiden voyage from Southampton to New York was successfully concluded on 21 June 1911, but as the ship was docking in New York harbour, a small incident took place. Docking at Pier 59 under the command of Captain Smith with the assistance of a harbour pilot, Olympic was being assisted by twelve tugs when one got caught in the backwash of Olympic, spun around, collided with the bigger ship, and for a moment was trapped under Olympic's stern, finally managing to work free and limp to the docks.

Hawke incident
On 20 September 1911, Olympics first major mishap occurred during a collision with a British warship, in which the warship lost her prow. Although the collision left two of Olympics compartments filled and one of her propeller shafts twisted, she was able to limp back to Southampton. At the resultant inquiry, the Royal Navy blamed Olympic, finding that her massive size generated a suction that pulled Hawke into her side. Captain Smith had been on the bridge during the events.

The Hawke incident was a financial disaster for White Star, and the out-of-service time for the big liner made matters worse. Olympic returned to Belfast and, to speed up the repairs, Harland and Wolff was forced to delay Titanics completion in order to use one of her propeller shafts and other parts for Olympic. Back at sea in February 1912, Olympic lost a propeller blade and once again returned for emergency repairs. To get her back to service immediately, Harland and Wolff again had to pull resources from Titanic, delaying her maiden voyage from 20 March to 10 April.

Titanic

Despite the past trouble, Smith was again appointed to command the newest ship in the Olympic class when the RMS Titanic left Southampton for her maiden voyage. Although some sources state that he had decided to retire after completing Titanics maiden voyage, an article in the Halifax Morning Chronicle on 9 April 1912 stated that Smith would remain in charge of Titanic "until the Company (White Star Line) completed a larger and finer steamer."

On 10 April 1912, Smith came aboard Titanic at 7 a.m. to prepare for the Board of Trade muster at 8:00 a.m. He immediately went to his cabin to get the sailing report from Chief Officer Henry Wilde. After departure at noon, the huge amount of water displaced by Titanic as she passed caused the laid-up New York to break from her moorings and swing towards Titanic. Quick action from Smith helped to avert a premature end to the maiden voyage.

The first four days of the voyage passed without incident, but on 14 April 1912, Titanics radio operators received six messages from other ships warning of drifting ice, which passengers on Titanic had begun to notice during the afternoon.

Titanics high speed in waters where ice had been reported was later criticised as reckless, but it reflected standard maritime practice at the time. According to Fifth Officer Harold Lowe, the custom was "to go ahead and depend upon the lookouts in the crow's nest and the watch on the bridge to pick up the ice in time to avoid hitting it".

The North Atlantic liners prioritised time-keeping above all other considerations, sticking rigidly to a schedule that would guarantee arrival at an advertised time. They were frequently driven at close to their full speed, treating hazard warnings as advisories rather than calls to action. It was widely believed that ice posed little risk; close calls were not uncommon, and even head-on collisions had not been disastrous. In 1907, a German liner, had rammed an iceberg and suffered a crushed bow, but was still able to complete her voyage. That same year, Titanics future captain, Edward Smith, declared in an interview that he could not "imagine any condition which would cause a ship to founder. Modern shipbuilding has gone beyond that."

Shortly after 11:40 p.m. on 14 April, Smith was informed by First Officer William Murdoch that the ship had just collided with an iceberg. It was soon apparent that the ship was seriously damaged; designer Thomas Andrews reported that all of the first five of the ship's watertight compartments had been breached and that Titanic would sink in under two hours.

There are conflicting reports about Smith's actions during the evacuation. Some say that he did all in his power to prevent panic and did his best to assist in the evacuation; Major Arthur Godfrey Peuchen of the Royal Canadian Yacht Club said "He was doing everything in his power to get women in these boats, and to see that they were lowered properly. I thought he was doing his duty in regard to the lowering of the boats". Robert Williams Daniel, a first class passenger, also said:

Other sources say that he was very ineffective and inactive in preventing loss of life. Captain Smith was an experienced seaman who had served for 40 years at sea, including 27 years in command. This was the first crisis of his career, and he would have known that even if all the boats were fully occupied, more than a thousand people would remain on the ship as she went down, with little or no chance of survival. As Smith began to grasp the enormity of what was about to happen, he appears to have become paralysed by indecision. He had ordered passengers and crew to muster, but from that point onward, he failed to order his officers to put the passengers into the lifeboats; he did not adequately organise the crew; he failed to convey crucial information to his officers and crew; he sometimes gave ambiguous or impractical orders and he never gave the command to abandon ship. Even some of his bridge officers were unaware for some time after the collision that the ship was sinking; Fourth Officer Joseph Boxhall did not find out until 01:15, barely an hour before the ship went down, while Quartermaster George Rowe was so unaware of the emergency that after the evacuation had started, he phoned the bridge from his watch station to ask why he had just seen a lifeboat go past. Smith did not inform his officers that the ship did not have enough lifeboats to save everyone. He did not supervise the loading of the lifeboats and seemingly made no effort to find out if his orders were being followed.

Just minutes before the ship started its final plunge, Smith was still busy releasing Titanic crew from their duties; he went to the Marconi operators room and released Junior Marconi Officer Harold Bride and senior wireless operator John "Jack" Phillips from their duties. He then carried out a final tour of the deck, telling crew members: "Now it's every man for himself." At 2:10 a.m., Steward Edward Brown saw the captain approach with a megaphone in his hand. He heard him say "Well boys, do your best for the women and children, and look out for yourselves." He saw the Captain walk onto the bridge alone. This was the last reliable sighting of Smith. A few minutes later Trimmer Samuel Hemming found the bridge apparently empty. Five minutes later, the ship disappeared beneath the ocean. Smith perished that night along with around 1,500 others, and his body was never recovered.

Death

There are conflicting accounts of Smith's death. Some survivors said they saw Smith enter the ship's wheelhouse on the bridge, and die there when it was engulfed. The New York Herald in its 19 April 1912 edition quoted Robert Williams Daniel, who jumped from the stern immediately before the ship sank, in its 19 April 1912 edition as having claimed to have witnessed Captain Smith drown in the ship's wheelhouse. "I saw Captain Smith on the bridge. My eyes seemingly clung to him. The deck from which I had leapt was immersed. The water had risen slowly, and was now to the floor of the bridge. Then it was to Captain Smith's waist. I saw him no more. He died a hero."

Captain Smith himself made statements hinting that he would go down with his ship if he was ever confronted with a disaster. A friend of Smith's, Dr. Williams, asked Captain Smith what would happen if the Adriatic struck a concealed reef of ice and was badly damaged. "Some of us would go to the bottom with the ship," was Smith's reply. A boyhood friend, William Jones said, "Ted Smith passed away just as he would have loved to do. To stand on the bridge of his vessel and go down with her was characteristic of all his actions when we were boys together." Because of these factors, as well as accounts of Smith going inside the wheelhouse, this has remained the iconic image of Smith, perpetuated by film portrayals.

When working to free Collapsible B, Junior Marconi Officer Harold Bride said he saw Captain Smith dive from the bridge into the sea just as Collapsible B was levered off the roof of the officers' quarters, a story corroborated by first class passenger Mrs Eleanor Widener, who was in Lifeboat No.4 (the closest to the sinking ship) at the time. Also second class passenger William John Mellors, who survived aboard Collapsible B, stated that Smith jumped from the bridge. Tim Maltin, author of 101 Things You Thought You Knew About The Titanic - But Didn't! affirms that the witnesses "could here be mistaking Captain Smith for Lightoller, who we know did exactly this at this time, first swimming towards the crow's nest."

Several accounts say that Smith may have been seen in the water near the overturned Collapsible B during or after the sinking. Colonel Archibald Gracie reported that an unknown swimmer came near the capsized and overcrowded lifeboat and that one of the men on board told him "Hold on to what you have, old boy. One more of you aboard would sink us all,"; in a powerful voice, the swimmer replied "All right boys. Good luck and God bless you.". Gracie did not see this man, nor was able to identify him, but some other survivors later claimed to have recognised this man as Smith. Another man (or possibly the same) never asked to come aboard the boat, but instead cheered its occupants saying "Good boys! Good lads!" with "the voice of authority".

One of the Collapsible B survivors, fireman Walter Hurst, tried to reach him with an oar, but the rapidly rising swell carried the man away before he could reach him. Hurst said he was certain this man was Smith. Some of these accounts also describe Smith carrying a child to the boat. Harry Senior, one of Titanics stokers, and second class passenger Charles Eugene Williams, who both survived aboard Collapsible B, stated that Smith swam with a child in his arms to Collapsible B, which Smith presented to a steward, after which he apparently swam back to the rapidly foundering ship. Williams' account differs slightly, claiming that, after Smith handed the child over to the steward, he asked what had become of First Officer Murdoch.

Upon hearing news of Murdoch's demise, Smith "pushed himself away from the lifeboat, threw his lifebelt from him and slowly sank from our sight. He did not come to the surface again." These accounts are almost certainly apocryphal, according to historians featured in the A&E Documentary Titanic: Death of a Dream. Lightoller who survived on Collapsible B never reported seeing Smith in the water or receiving a child from him. There is also no way survivors on Collapsible B would have been able to verify an individual's identity under such dimly lit and chaotic circumstances. It is more likely based on wishful thinking that the person they saw was the Captain. Captain Smith's fate will probably remain uncertain.

For many years, there were also conflicting accounts of Smith's last words. Newspaper reports said that as the final plunge began, Smith advised those on board to "Be British, boys. Be British!" Although this is engraved on his memorial and portrayed in the 1996 TV miniseries, it is a myth popularised by the British press at the time. If Smith had said these words to anyone, it would have been to the crew, but not one of the surviving crew members claimed he did. Because Steward Brown's account of Smith giving orders before walking onto the bridge was the last reliable sighting, this would make Smith's last words simply: "Well, boys, do your best for the women and children, and look out for yourselves."

Legacy

A statue, sculpted by Kathleen Scott, wife of Antarctic explorer Robert Falcon Scott, was unveiled in July 1914 at the western end of the Museum Gardens in Beacon Park, Lichfield. The pedestal is made from Cornish granite and the figure is bronze. Lichfield was chosen as the location for the monument because Smith was a Staffordshire man and Lichfield was the centre of the diocese. The statue originally cost £740 (£ with inflation) raised through local and national contributions.

For his stoicism and stiff upper lip self-discipline, fortitude and remaining calm in the face of adversity, which popular culture rendered into a British character trait, the plaque below his memorial statue states, "bequeathing to his countrymen, the memory [and] example of a great heart, a brave life and a heroic death, 'be British.'"

In 2010, as part of the "Parks for People" programme, the statue was restored and the green patina removed from its surface at a cost of £16,000. In 2011 an unsuccessful campaign was started to get the statue moved to Captain Smith's home town of Hanley.

Smith had already been commemorated in Hanley Town Hall with a plaque reading: "This tablet is dedicated to the memory of Commander Edward John Smith RD, RNR. Born in Hanley, 27th Jany 1850, died at sea, 15th April 1912. Whilst in command of the White Star SS Titanic that great ship struck an iceberg in the Atlantic Ocean during the night and speedily sank with nearly all who were on board. Captain Smith having done all man could do for the safety of passengers and crew remained at his post on the sinking ship until the end. His last message to the crew was 'Be British.'"

The plaque was removed in 1961, given to a local school and then returned to the Town Hall but remounted in the interior of the building in 1978. The Titanic Brewery in Burslem, Stoke-on-Trent, is in honour of him.

As a member of the Royal Naval Reserve, Smith wore his two decorations when in uniform: the Decoration for Officers of the Royal Naval Reserve and the Transport Medal.

Family
Smith's mother, Catherine Hancock, lived in Runcorn, Cheshire, where Smith himself intended to retire. She died there in 1893. Smith's half-sister Thyrza died in 1921 and his widow, Sarah Eleanor Smith, was hit and killed by a taxi in London in 1931. Their daughter, Helen Melville, married and gave birth to twins, Simon and Priscilla. Simon, a pilot in the Royal Air Force, was killed in World War II. Priscilla died from polio three years later; neither of them had children. Helen died in 1973.

Portrayals
Otto Wernicke (1943) (Titanic)
Brian Aherne (1953) (Titanic)
Clarence Derwent (1956) (Kraft Television Theatre) (A Night to Remember)
Laurence Naismith (1958) (A Night to Remember)
Michael Rennie (1966) (The Time Tunnel, episode Rendezvous With Yesterday) (fictionalised as "Captain Malcolm Smith")
Harry Andrews (1979) (S.O.S. Titanic) (TV Movie)
Hugh Reilly (1983) (Voyagers!) (Voyagers of the Titanic)
George C. Scott (1996) (Titanic) (TV Miniseries)
John Cunningham (1997) (Titanic) (Broadway Musical)
Bernard Hill (1997) (Titanic)
Kenneth Belton (2001) (Titanic: The Legend Goes On) (Animated Film)
John Donovan (2003) (Ghosts of the Abyss) (Documentary)
Alan Rothwell (2005) (Titanic: Birth of a Legend) (TV Documentary)
Malcolm Tierney (2008) (Who Sank the Titanic? aka The Unsinkable Titanic) (TV Documentary)
Christian Rodska (2011) (Curiosity, episode: "What Sank Titanic?") (TV episode)
David Calder (2012) (Titanic) (TV series/4 episodes)
Philip Rham (Titanic - The Musical) (Southwark Playhouse, 2013, and Charing Cross Theatre, London, 2016)

Bibliography
Titanic Captain: The Life of Edward John Smith, G.J. Cooper. , The History Press Ltd, 2011.

Notes

References

Sources

External links

One of Stoke-on-Trent Museums' Local Heroes
Captain Smith on Titanic-Titanic.com

1850 births
1912 deaths
19th-century English people
20th-century English people
British Merchant Navy officers
British Merchant Navy personnel
British military personnel of the Second Boer War
Captains who went down with the ship
Deaths on the RMS Titanic
English sailors
Military personnel from Staffordshire
People from Hanley, Staffordshire
People from Southampton
Royal Naval Reserve personnel
Royal Navy officers
Steamship captains
White Star Line